The 1958 San Francisco 49ers season was the team's ninth in the NFL. The team had an 8–4 record the previous season. During a four-game road trip, the 49ers only won one game and finished with a 6–6 record, 4th place in the NFL Western Division. Each of the team's quarterbacks, Y. A. Tittle and John Brodie, started six of the twelve games and ended the season with similar statistics.

Offseason

Draft

Schedule

Standings

References 

San Francisco 49ers seasons
San Francisco 49ers